The 1944 Navy Midshipmen football team represented the United States Naval Academy during the 1944 college football season. In their first season under head coach Oscar Hagberg, the Midshipmen compiled a 6–3 record, shut out three opponents and outscored all opponents by a combined score of 236 to 88. Navy was ranked No. 4 in the final AP Poll.

Schedule

References

Navy
Navy Midshipmen football seasons
Navy Midshipmen football